Bonaranda (also Romanized as Bonārāndā) is a village in Hati Rural District, Hati District, Lali County, Khuzestan Province, Iran. At the 2006 census, its population was 196, in 31 families.

References 

Populated places in Lali County